Liadh Ní Riada (born 28 November 1966) is an Irish Sinn Féin politician who formerly served as a Member of the European Parliament (MEP) for the South constituency from 2014 to 2019. She was the Sinn Féin candidate in the 2018 presidential election. As of July 2020, Ní Riada is an Irish language planning officer for the Gaeltacht in Muskerry, County Cork.

Personal life
Ní Riada was born in Dublin, but raised in County Cork. Ní Riada is the daughter of composer Seán Ó Riada, who died when she was four. Her mother died when she was 10. She resides in Ballyvourney in the Muskerry Gaeltacht area in County Cork, with her second husband, Nicky Forde, and three daughters. She was married to Fiachra Ó hAodha for 10 months until his death in 1997. She is a native Irish speaker.

Media career
Ní Riada is a former television producer and director and she served on the board tasked with setting up TG4, the Irish language television channel. She has directed and produced several documentaries, and ran her own production company for several years. Ní Riada has described herself as passionate about heritage and culture, and she has been a vocal advocate for Irish language rights.

Political career
Ní Riada's involvement in politics began in 2011 when she joined Sinn Féin as the party's national Irish language officer, having been inspired by her first husband Fiachra to get involved in politics. Three years later, in 2014, Ní Riada was selected as the Sinn Féin candidate for the South constituency for the 2014 European Parliament elections.

European Parliament
Ní Riada ran her 2014 campaign for the European Parliament on an anti-austerity message, calling for job creation and an end to forced emigration from Ireland. During the campaign, she also raised awareness of the increase in child poverty in Ireland, and the need for rural regeneration. She secured 125,309 first preference votes, the second highest of all MEPs in Ireland, and was elected on the fourth count with 132,590 votes.

As an MEP, Ní Riada sat on three Committees of the European Parliament: Budgets, Culture and Education, and Fisheries.

She was a coordinator for the European United Left–Nordic Green Left group on the Budgets Committee. 

On the committee on Culture and Education, Ní Riada has highlighted what she called the "language discrimination" in the EU. Through this committee, she has highlighted what she called the "hardships" many artists have to go through to earn a living. Since 2017 Ní Riada has been a member of the Culture and Educations Brexit monitoring group.

On the Fisheries Committee, she has called for a "fairer deal" for Irish fishermen. Ní Riada has been critical of the EU's Common Fisheries Policy, saying that she believes Irish fisheries have not received their fair share of the fishing quota. Ní Riada has also campaigned for measures to reduce plastic pollution, particularly in the oceans.

She lost her seat at the 2019 European Parliament election.

2018 presidential election
On 16 September 2018, Ní Riada was selected by Sinn Féin to contest the upcoming Irish presidential election. The party, in deciding to challenge incumbent Michael D. Higgins, said there was "an appetite for political and social change" in Ireland.

Ní Riada's campaign focused on the Irish language, a united Ireland, and social justice. She called for the presidential salary to be cut in half and said that she would only serve a single presidential term if elected. During the campaign she stated she would wear a remembrance poppy to commemorate the war dead of the First World War.

Ni Ríada received 6.38% of first preference votes in the election which was held on 26 October 2018.

References

External links

Liadh Ni Riada's page on the VoteWatch website

1966 births
20th-century Irish people
Living people
21st-century women MEPs for the Republic of Ireland
Irish television directors
Irish television producers
MEPs for the Republic of Ireland 2014–2019
Sinn Féin MEPs
Politicians from County Cork
Candidates for President of Ireland
Women television producers
Women television directors